Rafael Eduardo Medina (born February 15, 1975) is a Panamanian former professional baseball pitcher. He played for the Florida Marlins of Major League Baseball (MLB) from 1998 to 1999. He also has played for the Panama national baseball team.

Career
Medina was originally signed by the New York Yankees as an amateur free agent in 1992. He began his professional career the following year with the Yankees' rookie team, then spent 1994 with the Oneonta Yankees, where he had a win–loss record of 3-7 and a 4.66 earned run average (ERA) in 14 games. He split 1995 with the Greensboro Bats and Tampa Yankees. With Tampa, he had a 2.37 ERA in six games. Medina was promoted to the Norwich Navigators, and had a 5-8 record, a 3.06 ERA, and 112 strikeouts in 19 games. After the 1996 season ended, he was traded to the San Diego Padres with Rubén Rivera for Hideki Irabu and Homer Bush.

Medina spent 1997 with the Las Vegas Stars, the Padres' AAA affiliate. He had a 7.56 ERA in 13 games, and scouts no longer considered him a top prospect like they had a season prior due to the poor stats and a lack of confidence. After a season with the Padres, they traded him to the Florida Marlins with Steve Hoff and Derrek Lee for Kevin Brown. With the Marlins, he made the opening day roster, and pitched in 12 games for the team in 1998, going 2-6 with a 6.01 ERA. The Marlins then tried using Medina as a relief pitcher, and he split 1999 with Florida and the Calgary Cannons. With the major league squad he had a 5.79 ERA in 20 games.

After the season, Medina was picked up by the Atlanta Braves. He spent the next two seasons with the Syracuse SkyChiefs and the Memphis Redbirds, then spent 2002 with the Algodoneros de Torreón of the Mexican League. He spent two more seasons playing professional baseball, then joined the Panama national baseball team. He was part of the team during the 2009 World Baseball Classic, and pitched a third of an inning in one game.

References

External links

1975 births
Living people
Algodoneros de Torreón players
Calgary Cannons players
Charlotte Knights players
Criollos de Caguas players
Panamanian expatriate baseball players in Puerto Rico
Expatriate baseball players in Italy
Florida Marlins players
Gigantes de Carolina players
Greensboro Bats players
Gulf Coast Yankees players
Las Vegas Stars (baseball) players
Liga de Béisbol Profesional Roberto Clemente pitchers
Major League Baseball pitchers
Major League Baseball players from Panama
Memphis Redbirds players
Mexican League baseball pitchers
Norwich Navigators players
Oneonta Yankees players
Panamanian expatriate baseball players in Canada
Panamanian expatriate baseball players in Mexico
Panamanian expatriate baseball players in the United States
Panamanian expatriate sportspeople in Italy
Parma Baseball Club players
Rancho Cucamonga Quakes players
Sportspeople from Panama City
Syracuse SkyChiefs players
Tampa Yankees players
Tigres de Aragua players
Panamanian expatriate baseball players in Venezuela
Victoria Capitals players
2009 World Baseball Classic players
Panamanian expatriate baseball players in Taiwan
Chinatrust Whales players